Farhan Khan is an Indian model and television actor. He is mostly known for his brief role in Sony TV's  Chhanchhan.

Overview
Farhan Khan was born in Burhanpur. He comes from a family of people with a film, TV and stage background. His grandfather was a distributor and film publicist and his father is a theatre artiste, a film and TV producer and a documentary filmmaker. His uncle is an established producer and also makes documentaries edits of education, and his brother Tabrez Khan is a director of TV shows like Bhagyavidhaata among others. His older brother and mother are both writers.

Career

Khan's first television role was the male lead in Sony Entertainment Television's show, Chhanchhan it failed to gain ratings.' Chhanchhan ended on 19 September 2013.

References

1983 births
Living people
Indian male television actors
Indian male models
People from Burhanpur
Male actors from Madhya Pradesh
Male actors from Mumbai